The Winthrop Glacier is a large glacier on the northeastern side of Mount Rainier in Washington. Named after Theodore Winthrop, the body of ice covers 3.5 mile2 (9.1 km2) and has a volume of 18.5 billion feet3 (523 million m3). Another glacier, the Emmons Glacier is directly connected to this glacier up to the Steamboat Prow. After passing the Prow, the glaciers split up; the Emmons heads east-northeastward and the Winthrop continues northeast. Meltwater from the glacier drains into the White River.

Debris flows
The glacier is one of four on Mount Rainier that are known to have released debris flows. Similar flows have stemmed from the Nisqually, Kautz, and South Tahoma glaciers as well.

See also
List of glaciers

References

Glaciers of Mount Rainier
Glaciers of Washington (state)